Wang Je or Wang Jik was a Goryeo Royal Prince as the only son of King Hyejong and Lady Yeon. There was no much records left about his life.

References

Korean princes
Year of birth unknown
Year of death unknown